Obelism is the practice of annotating manuscripts with marks set in the margins. Modern obelisms are used by editors when proofreading a manuscript or typescript. Examples are "stet" (which is Latin for "Let it stand", used in this context to mean "disregard the previous mark") and "dele" (for "Delete").

The obelos symbol (see obelus) gets its name from the spit, or sharp end of a lance in ancient Greek. An obelos was placed by editors on the margins of manuscripts, especially in Homer, to indicate lines that may not have been written by Homer. The system was developed by Aristarchus and notably used later by Origen in his Hexapla. Origen marked spurious words with an opening obelos and a closing metobelos ("end of obelus").

There were many other such shorthand symbols, to indicate corrections, emendations, deletions, additions, and so on. Loosely, all these symbols, and the act of annotation by means of them, are obelism.

These nine ancient Greek textual annotation symbols are also included in the supplemental punctuation list of ISO/IEC 10646 standard for character sets.

Modern encoding

Unicode encodes the following:
 
 
 
 
 
 
 
 
 
 
 
 
 
 

Some of these were also used in Ancient Greek punctuation as word dividers.

See also
 
 
 . A horizontal form of the dagger mark was used an obelus.
 
 
 List of proofreader's marks
 General PunctuationUnicode block containing punctuation, spacing, and formatting characters

References

Palaeography
Punctuation
Ancient Greek punctuation